La Provincia di Cremona is a regional daily Italian newspaper based in Cremona, Italy. The paper was established in 1947. Its publisher is Soc. Editoriale Cremonese S.P.A. One of its former editors is Antonio Grassi.

References

External links
 

1947 establishments in Italy
Italian-language newspapers
Daily newspapers published in Italy
Publications established in 1947